KAIC can refer to:

 KAIC (FM), a radio station (88.9 FM) licensed to serve Tucson, Arizona, United States
 One thousand Ampere Interrupting Capacity
 KaiC, a gene
 KAI Commuter, a railway operator in Indonesia